The 2012 Elon Phoenix football team represented Elon University in the 2012 NCAA Division I FCS football season. They were led by second-year head coach Jason Swepson and played their home games at Rhodes Stadium. They are a member of the Southern Conference. They finished the season 3–8, 1–7 in SoCon play to finish in eighth place.

Schedule

 Source: Schedule

Players
 2 Miles Williams  DB 6-1 208 So.  Roebuck, S.C. / Dorman
 3  Aaron Mellette  WR 6-4 220 Sr.  Sanford, N.C. / Southern Lee
 4  Andre Davis  WR 5-10 181 R-Fr.  Bunn, N.C. / Bunn
 5  Ricky Brown  WR 6-2 214 R-Fr.  Winston-Salem, N.C. / West Forsyth
 6  Blake Thompson  LB 6-1 211 Sr.  Elkridge, Md. / Cardinal Gibbons
 7  Mike Quinn  QB 6-3 193 So.  Wayne, N.J. / Wayne Hills
 8  Rasaun Rorie  WR 6-1 206 Jr.  Morven, N.C. / Anson
 9  Blake Rice  WR 5-10 189 R-Fr.  Tampa, Fla. / Robinson
 10  Karl Bostick  RB 5-9 201 So.  Englewood, N.J. / Univ. of Akron
 11  John Loughery  QB 6-4 213 Fr.  Wayne, Pa. / Hun School
 12  Thomas Wilson  QB 6-4 222 Sr.  Raleigh, N.C. / Leesville Road
 13  Bo Hartman  DB 5-8 171 Fr.  Centreville, Va. / Westfield
 13  Adam LaFleur  WR 6-1 200 So.  Bel Air, Md. / Fork Union Military Academy
 14  David Williams  DB 5-8 182 Jr.  Chester, Va. / Thomas Dale
 15  Tyler Smith  QB 6-4 215 So.  Easton, Pa. / Univ. of Maryland
 17  Jeremy Gloston  DB 6-1 198 Fr.  Orlando, Fla. / Colonial
 18  Jeremy Peterson  WR 5-9 179 Sr.  Winston-Salem, N.C. / R.J. Reynolds
 20  David Wood  DB 5-10 170 Jr.  Park Ridge, N.J. / Saint Joseph Regional
 21  Jerrell Armstrong  DB 5-9 168 R-Fr.  New Bern, N.C. / New Bern
 22  Tracey Coppedge  RB 5-8 166 Fr.  Nashville, N.C. / Southern Nash
 23  Akeem Langham  DB 5-10 180 So.  High Point, N.C. / High Point Central
 24  Quinton Lightfoot  LB 5-10 209 Jr.  Crawfordville, Fla. / Florida State HS
 26  Alexander Dawson  LB 5-11 209 So.  Haw River, N.C. / Eastern Alamance
 27  Adrian McClendon  DB 5-9 161 Fr.  Jacksonville, Fla. / First Coast
 29  Edward Burns  DB 5-10 168 Jr.  Sylvania, Ga. / Screven County
 30  Julius Moore  DB 5-11 195 Fr.  Chesterfield, Va. / Cosby
 31  Kierre Brown  WR 5-9 168 So.  Charlotte, N.C. / Independence
 32  Adam Shreiner  K 5-9 190 Sr.  Marietta, Ga. / Walton
 33  B.J. Bennett  RB 6-0 204 Fr.  West Columbia, S.C. / Hammond School
 34  John Lopez  LB 5-9 202 Fr.  Westchester, N.Y. / Kennedy Catholic
 35  Jordan Thompson  DB 5-9 166 So.  Hickory, N.C. / Hickory
 36  Hatchel Linens  DB 5-10 158 Fr.  Morganton, N.C. / Patton
 36  Thuc Phan  RB 5-6 160 Fr.  Greensboro, N.C. / Deerfield Academy (Mass.)
 37  Lichota Seidewand  WR 5-10 154 Fr.  Chatham, Mass. / Nauset Regional
 38  Thonda Taylor  LB 5-10 228 Sr.  Millington, Tenn. / Heidelberg American
 39  Carson Simpson  WR 6-0 161 Fr.  Greenwood, S.C. / Greenwood
 39  Joe Watkins  DB 5-10 168 So.  Hyattsville, Md. / Gonzaga College High
 40  Matt Eastman  RB 6-1 231 Jr.  Tampa, Fla. / Armwood
 41  Chandler Wrightenberry  DB 5-11 202 Jr.  Asheville, N.C. / T.C. Roberson
 42  Robert Davis  DL 6-1 225 R-Fr.  Thomasville, N.C. / Thomasville
 43  Evan Kendrick  LB 5-9 206 R-Fr.  Gahanna, Ohio / St. Francis DeSales
 45  Tony Thompson  DL 6-1 274 Jr.  Simpsonville, S.C. / Hillcrest
 46  Danny Sellers  WR 6-3 200 So.  St. Augustine, Fla. / Bartram Trail
 47  Michael Crispi  LS 5-10 210 So.  Dix Hills, N.Y. / Half Hollow Hills West
 48  Corey Mitchell  LB 6-0 210 Fr.  Jacksonville, N.C. / Northside
 49  Ryan Seaberg  DL 6-1 210 Fr.  Chattanooga, Tenn. / Baylor School
 50  John Silas  LB 5-11 225 Fr.  Powder Springs, Ga. / Hillgrove
 51  Derek Vereen  OL 6-3 280 R-Fr.  Durham, N.C. / Hillside
 52  Jonathan Spain  LB 6-2 238 So.  Greensboro, N.C. / Page
 53  Ty Alt  OL 6-2 271 Fr.  Sewickley, Pa. / Greensburg Central Catholic
 54  Jared Lennon  LB 6-1 198 Fr.  Carrboro, N.C. / Carrboro
 55  Odell Benton  LB 6-0 205 So.  Jacksonville, N.C. / Richlands
 56  Mike Warren  DL 6-4 236 Fr.  Jacksonville, N.C. / White Oak
 57  Haris Cesko  OL 6-4 269 Fr.  Grayson, Ga. / Grayson
 58  Will Nork  LB 6-2 195 Fr.  Charlotte, N.C. / First Assembly Christian
 59  Jordan Jones  DL 6-1 245 Jr.  Lakeland, Fla. / Lakeland
 60  Dustin Ruff  DL 5-11 276 So.  Waxhaw, N.C. / Parkwood
 61  Brian Gerwig  OL 6-1 309 So.  Winston-Salem, N.C. / Trinity Collegiate (S.C.)
 62  Kyle Herbert  OL 6-1 291 Sr.  Hillsborough, N.C. / Cardinal Gibbons
 64  Anthony Cammarata  OL 6-4 245 Fr.  Asheville, N.C. / Asheville
 64  Kyle Einwaechter  DL 6-1 310 Fr.  Bethesda, Md. / Walt Whitman
 66  John Libretti  OL 6-4 273 Fr.  Cold Spring Harbor, N.Y. / Cold Spring Harbor
 67  Matt Arnholt  LS 6-1 198 Fr.  Miami, Fla. / Gulliver Prep
 68  Jack Williams  OL 5-11 269 Fr.  Avondale Estates, Ga. / Woodward Academy
 69  Gordon Acha  OL 6-3 263 Fr.  Duxbury, Mass. / Duxbury
 70  Clay Johnson  OL 6-2 271 Jr.  Hickory, N.C. / Hickory
 71  Austin Sowell  OL 6-4 274 So.  Knoxville, Tenn. / Knoxville West
 72  Dennis Wagner  OL 6-3 294 Jr.  Fredericksburg, Va. / Chancellor
 73  Tyler Drake  DL 6-1 215 Fr.  Annapolis, Md. / Broadneck
 74  Sean McCoy  OL 6-1 264 Fr.  Leesburg, Va. / Stone Bridge
 76  Thomas McGuire  OL 6-3 255 R-Fr.  Ames, Iowa / Gilbert
 77  Jacob Ingle  OL 6-1 286 Fr.  Burlington, N.C. / Williams
 78  Gavin Billings  OL 6-5 267 Jr.  Kannapolis, N.C. / Northwest Cabarrus
 79  Justin Ward  OL 6-4 307 Sr.  Summerfield, N.C. / Rockingham County
 80  Alex Moore  WR 6-0 184 Fr.  Chapel Hill, N.C. / East Chapel Hill
 81  Justin Osborne  WR 5-8 159 Fr.  Jacksonville, Fla. / First Coast
 82  Doug Warrick  TE 6-5 215 Fr.  Hamilton, N.J. / Cheshire Academy
 83  Chris Harris  TE 6-4 242 Sr.  Ocean View, N.J. / Ocean City
 84  Kenton Beal  P/K 5-11 187 Jr.  Cape Coral, Fla. / Cape Coral
 86  David Lowrey  WR 6-0 164 Fr.  Maitland, Fla. / Orangewood Christian
 87  Brice Wordsworth  TE 6-4 225 So.  Rocky Mount, N.C. / Rocky Mount Academy
 88  Jesse Tate  TE 6-1 229 Fr.  Toms River, N.J. / Toms River North
 90  Olufemi Lamikanra  DL 6-1 245 Sr.  Tallahassee, Fla. / Lawton Chiles
 91  Gary Coates  DL 6-2 230 So.  Irmo, S.C. / Dutch Fork
 92  Gray Eller  TE 6-2 205 Fr.  Winston-Salem, N.C. / R.J. Reynolds
 92  Chris Smith  K 6-0 190 Fr.  Darien, Conn. / Darien
 93  Rob Sullivan  DL 6-4 225 R-Fr.  Scottsdale, Ariz. / Notre Dame Prep
 94  Zach Duprey  TE 6-1 220 Fr.  Stanardsville, Va. / William Monroe
 94  Spencer Linquist  K/P 5-10 185 So.  Newton, N.C. / Lenoir-Rhyne Univ.
 95  Michael Pearson  DL 6-1 277 So.  Laurens, S.C. / Laurens
 96  Lawson Hodges  K 5-9 168 So.  Thomasville, N.C. / Thomasville
 98  Chris Jones  DL 6-2 274 Fr.  Fayetteville, N.C. / Douglas Byrd
 99  Jay Brown  DL 6-4 247 Jr.  Sandy Springs, Ga. / Riverwood

Statistics
 TEAM STATISTICS        ELON  /OPPONENTS
 SCORING    250      /326
 Points Per Game  25.00  /32.60
 FIRST DOWNS          198  /185
 Rushing          48  /114
 Passing          135  /57
 Penalty          15  /14
 RUSHING YARDAGE  853  /2361
 Yards gained rushing  1215  /2622
 Yards lost rushing  362  /261
 Rushing Attempts  334  /434
 Average Per Rush  2.6  /5.4
 Average Per Game  85.3  /236.1
 TDs Rushing          4  /26
 PASSING YARDAGE  2981  /1477
 Att-Comp-Int       378-246-10 /214-114-8
 Average Per Pass  7.89  /6.90
 Average Per Catch  12.12  /12.96
 Average Per Game  298.10  /147.70
 TDs Passing          25  /15
 TOTAL OFFENSE         3834  /3838
 Total Plays          712  /648
 Average Per Play  5.4  /5.9
 Average Per Game  383.4  /383.8
 KICK RETURNS: #-Yards  37-759  /43-834
 PUNT RETURNS: #-Yards  17-136  /20-349
 INT RETURNS: #-Yards  8-88  /10-100
 KICK RETURN AVERAGE  20.51  /19.40
 PUNT RETURN AVERAGE  8.00  /17.45
 INT RETURN AVERAGE  11.00  /10.00
 TEAM STATISTICS  ELON  /OPPONENTS
 FUMBLES-LOST          19-12  /16-10
 PENALTIES-Yards  48-435  /63-508
 Average Per Game  43.50  /50.80
 PUNTS-Yards          48-1859 /51-1940
 Average Per Game  38.73  /38.04
 Net punt average  31.46  /31.20
 TIME OF POSSESSION  05:18:35 /04:41:25
 Average Per Game  31:52  /28:08
 3RD-DOWN Conversions  56-152  /51-133
 3rd Down Percentage  36.84% /38.35 %
 4TH-DOWN Conversions  6-16  /8-11
 4th-Down Percentage  37.50% /72.73 %
 SACKS BY-Yards         14-86  /28-147
 MISC YARDS          0  /5
 TOUCHDOWNS SCORED  29  /43
 FIELD GOALS-ATTEMPTS  15-20  /9-16
 ON-SIDE KICKS          0-1  /0-0
 RED-ZONE SCORES  31-42  /30-39

Coaches
 Jason Swepson  Head Football Coach
 Chris Pincince  Assistant Football Coach (Offensive Coordinator/Running Backs/Quarterbacks
 Ed Pinkham  Assistant Football Coach (Defensive Coordinator)
 Scott Browne  Assistant Football Coach (Recruiting Coordinator/Special Teams Coordinator)
 Ron Mattes  Assistant Football Coach (Offensive Line)
 Kevin Downing  Assistant Football Coach (Wide Receivers)
 Bobby Blick  Assistant Football Coach (Tight Ends)
 Jerrick Hall  Assistant Football Coach (Defensive Line)
 Freddie Aughtry-Lindsay  Assistant Football Coach (Linebackers)
 Dan O'Brien  Assistant Football Coach (Defensive Backs)
 Eric Estes  Director of Football Operations
 Mitch Rippy  Volunteer Assistant Coach
 Kenny Simpson  Athletic Facilities and Equipment Manager
 Brett Davis  Athletics Video Coordinator

References

Elon
Elon Phoenix football seasons
Elon Phoenix football